The Cat S60 is a mobile phone introduced in 2016 by Caterpillar Inc. within the Cat phones line and has since been succeeded by the Cat S61 and Cat S62 Pro. It is the first smartphone to include an integrated thermal imaging camera and presently the world's most waterproof smartphone.

References

Cat phone
Mobile phones introduced in 2016
Mobile phones with multiple rear cameras
Smartphones